Hamsavaram railway station (station code:HVM), is an Indian Railways station in Hamsavaram of East Godavari district in the Indian state of Andhra Pradesh. It lies on the Howrah–Chennai main line. It is administered under Vijayawada railway division of South Coast Railway zone. It is 3378th most busiest railway station in India It halts 8 trains every day.

History 
The southern part of the East Coast State Railway (from Waltair to Vijayawada) was taken over by Madras Railway in 1901.

Classification 
In terms of earnings and outward passengers handled, Hamsavaram is categorized as a Non-Suburban Grade-6 (NSG-6) railway station. Based on the re–categorization of Indian Railway stations for the period of 2017–18 and 2022–23, an NSG–6 category station earns nearly  crore and handles close to  passengers.

References

External links 

Railway stations in East Godavari district
Vijayawada railway division